Now 07 is a compilation CD released under EMI Music Australia in 2004.

Track listing
Missy Higgins – "Scar" (3:31)
Robbie Williams – "Radio" (3:49)
Houston featuring Chingy, Nate Dogg and I-20 – "I Like That" (3:56)
Simple Plan – "Addicted" (3:53)
Eric Prydz – "Call on Me" (2:48)
Joss Stone – "You Had Me" (3:35)
Little Birdy – "Beautiful to Me" (3:22)
Brandy – "Afrodisiac" (3:48)
Cosima – "One Night Without You" (4:51)
Twista – "Sunshine" (3:45)
Jamelia – "See It in a Boy's Eyes" (3:52)
Kyle – "Beautiful Woman" (3:46)
Kate Alexa – "Always There" (3:47)
Solitaire – "I'm Thinking of You (Baby)" (4:01)
Evermore – "It's Too Late" (3:57)
Junior Jack – "Stupidisco" (5:08)
The Shapeshifters – "Lola's Theme" (3:25)
Cristian Alexanda – "Party Anthem" (3:08)
The Living End – "I Can't Give You What I Haven't Got" (2:18)
Jet – "Cold Hard Bitch" (4:04)
Neon – "A Man" (2:36)

External links
 NOW 07 @ Australian Charts

2004 compilation albums
EMI Records compilation albums
Now That's What I Call Music! albums (Australian series)